The Finima Nature Park is a natural park in Bonny Island, Rivers State, Nigeria covering an area of approximately 1000 ha (3.9 sq mi). It was established by the Nigeria Liquefied Natural Gas Limited with the aim of conserving nature and biodiversity in the region.

Ecology
Finima's reserve area is covered by tropical rainforest and mangrove swamps, some parts contain sand with freshwater ponds and tall timber between the swamps and the beach.

Flora
Vegetation of the park has progressively developed into a high forest considering the form from which it began in 1999. There are two storeys that can be distinguished from outside the forest, the emergents include Symphonia globulifera, Cleistopholis patens, Uapaca spp., Musanga cecropioides, Hallea ledermannii, Terminalia spp., Anthostema aubryanum, Tectona grandis and Elaeis guineensis. The understory is composed mainly of Calamus deeratus, Alchornea cordifolia, Monodora tenuifolia, Harungana madagascariensis, Strophanthus preussii, Rauvolfia vomitoria and Raphia spp.

The interior of the forest is very shady, and as a result a wide variety of shade tolerant forbs (e.g. Nephrolepis biserrata, Culcasia scandens, Laportea spp., Chromolaena odorata, Aframomum melegueta and Costus afer) and various sedges form thickets on the forest floor. By dry season, large cushion of litter cover the floor because of increase in abscission rate of some plants such as Musanga cecropioides, Hallea ledermannii, Calamus deeratus, Gmelina arborea, Raphia spp. and Elaeis guineensis.

Fauna
Finima Nature Park is home to some wildlife species of high conservation value, a variety of mammals, birds and reptiles including crocodiles,
snakes and alligators. The site of the nature park is the natural habitat of salt water hippopotamuses. The area is protected by park rangers and hunting is prohibited.

References

External links

Protected areas established in 1999
1990s establishments in Rivers State
Parks in Rivers State
Forests of Rivers State
Nature parks in Nigeria
1999 establishments in Nigeria